Wesley Barresi (born 3 May 1984) is a South African born first-class and Netherlands international cricketer. He is a right-handed wicket keeper-batsman and also bowls right-arm offbreak. In February 2021, Barresi announced his retirement from all forms of cricket, but returned to the national team in August 2022.

Career
Wesley became the 100th victim to Indian cricketer Yuvraj Singh, when he was dismissed in the 2011 World Cup game against India.

In July 2018, he was named in the Netherlands' One Day International (ODI) squad, for their series against Nepal. Ahead of the ODI matches, the International Cricket Council (ICC) named him as the key player for the Netherlands.

In July 2019, he was selected to play for the Amsterdam Knights in the inaugural edition of the Euro T20 Slam cricket tournament. However, the following month, the tournament was cancelled.

References

External links

1984 births
Living people
Netherlands One Day International cricketers
Netherlands Twenty20 International cricketers
Cricketers at the 2011 Cricket World Cup
South African emigrants to the Netherlands
Cricketers from Johannesburg
White South African people
Wicket-keepers
Dutch cricketers